Leo Clement Andrew Arkfeld (born in 1912 in Butte, Nebraska) was an American clergyman and bishop for the Roman Catholic Diocese of Wewak.

He was appointed bishop of Wewak in 1948, and Archbishop of Madang in 1975 until his retirement in 1987. He died in 1999.

References 

1912 births
1999 deaths
American Roman Catholic bishops by contiguous area of the United States
Roman Catholic archbishops of Madang
Roman Catholic bishops of Wewak
20th-century American clergy